Gubernatoriana triangulus is a species of freshwater crab in the family Gecarcinucidae. The species is endemic to the Western Ghats in India.

Etymology 
Triangulus is the Latin word for "triangular". Gubernatoriana triangulus has a triangular G1 subterminal segment.

Description 
They have a brown carapace, and yellowish brown chelipeds and ambulatory legs.

Distribution 
Gubernatoriana triangulus's type locality is the Satara and Pune district of Maharashtra in the Western Ghats. It is endemic to this area.

References 

Gecarcinucidae
Freshwater crustaceans of Asia
Fauna of India
Animals described in 2014